Chandler Hutchison (born April 26, 1996) is an American former professional basketball player. He played college basketball at Boise State, and played four seasons in the NBA, most notably for the Chicago Bulls.

High school career
Hutchison lettered two years at Mission Viejo High School. As a junior, he averaged 13.8 points and 4.8 rebounds while leading Mission Viejo to the regional quarterfinals of the CIF Southern Section 1AA Tournament.

In his senior season, he was ranked No. 80 in the ESPN Top 100, the No. 7 prospect in California and a consensus 4-star recruit by 247 Sports. He averaged 19.5 points and led Mission Viejo to the CIF Southern Section title game and regional quarterfinals of CIF State Championship tournament.

College career
Hutchison posted 3.1 points per game as a freshman and started in the NCAA Tournament matchup versus Dayton. He averaged 6.8 points and 4.1 rebounds per game as a sophomore in 2015–16. With the departure of James Webb III, coach Leon Rice began to look at Hutchison as more of an offensive threat, and he responded by hitting the weight room and remaking his jump shot. He had a breakout season as a junior, averaging 17.4 points, 7.8 rebounds and 2.6 assists per game while making 37.7% of his threes. He declared for the 2017 NBA Draft but returned to the Broncos. Hutchison had a stellar senior year, averaging 20 points and 7.7 rebounds per contest. As a senior, he was named to the First-team All-Mountain West Conference. Hutchison was a Top-10 Finalist for the Jerry West Award and a Top-30 Finalist for the Naismith Trophy. Hutchison also was one of two MW Players of the Year, earning the honor from league media while Nevada's Caleb Martin received the honor from the league's coaches.

Professional career

Chicago Bulls (2018–2021)
Hutchison was drafted 22nd overall in the 2018 NBA draft by the Chicago Bulls. On July 3, 2018, Hutchison officially signed with the Bulls. He made his NBA debut playing three minutes in a loss to the Philadelphia 76ers on October 18.

On January 23, Hutchison suffered an acute injury to a sesamoid bone in his right foot. He was assigned to the Bulls’ NBA G League affiliate, the Windy City Bulls to rehabilitate his injury on December 31, 2019.

Washington Wizards (2021)
On March 25, 2021, Hutchison was traded to the Washington Wizards in a three-team trade involving the Boston Celtics.

On August 6, Hutchison was traded to the San Antonio Spurs and was later waived on September 4.

Phoenix Suns (2021–2022)
On September 7, 2021, Hutchison signed a two-way contract with the Phoenix Suns. He played six games for the Suns, totaling 23 minutes. On January 4, 2022, he was waived.

Sioux Falls Skyforce (2022)
On February 1, 2022, Hutchison was acquired by the Sioux Falls Skyforce. Hutchison joined the Atlanta Hawks for the 2022 NBA Summer League. He rejoined the Skyforce for the beginning of the 2022–23 season.

On November 29, 2022, Hutchison retired at the age of 26.

Career statistics

NBA

Regular season

|-
| style="text-align:left;"|
| style="text-align:left;"|Chicago
| 44 || 14 || 20.3 || .459 || .280 || .605 || 4.2 || .8 || .5 || .1 || 5.2
|-
| style="text-align:left;"|
| style="text-align:left;"|Chicago
| 28 || 10 || 18.8 || .457 || .316 || .590 || 3.9 || .9 || 1.0 || .3 || 7.8
|-
| style="text-align:left;"|
| style="text-align:left;"|Chicago
| 7 || 0 || 9.1 || .278 || .333 || 1.000 || 2.9 || .6 || .1 || .0 || 1.9
|-
| style="text-align:left;"|
| style="text-align:left;"| Washington
| 18 || 1 || 15.7 || .400 || .368 || .826 || 3.2 || .7 || .6 || .6 || 5.2
|-
| style="text-align:left;"|
| style="text-align:left;"| Phoenix
| 6 || 0 || 3.7 || .500 ||  || 1.000 || .8 || .3 || .0 || .0 || .7
|- class="sortbottom"
| style="text-align:center;" colspan="2"|Career
| 103 || 25 || 17.4 || .442 || .309 || .643 || 3.7 || .8 || .6 || .2 || 5.4

Playoffs

|-
| style="text-align:left;"|2021
| style="text-align:left;"|Washington
| 2 || 0 || 9.0 || .400 ||  || 1.000 || 1.5 || .5 || .0 || .0 || 3.0
|- class="sortbottom"
| style="text-align:center;" colspan="2"| Career
| 2 || 0 || 9.0 || .400 ||  || 1.000 || 1.5 || .5 || .0 || .0 || 3.0

College

|-
| style="text-align:left;"|2014–15
| style="text-align:left;"|Boise State
| 29 || 18 || 12.3 || .356 || .286 || .649 || 2.0 || .8 || .5 || .1 || 3.1
|-
| style="text-align:left;"|2015–16
| style="text-align:left;"|Boise State
| 31 || 8 || 19.8 || .497 || .231 || .636 || 4.1 || 1.3 || .7 || .4 || 6.8
|-
| style="text-align:left;"|2016–17
| style="text-align:left;"|Boise State
| 32 || 32 || 31.7|| .495 || .377 || .665 || 7.8 || 2.6 || 1.2 || .2 || 17.4
|-
| style="text-align:left;"|2017–18
| style="text-align:left;"|Boise State
| 31 || 31 || 31.0 || .475 || .385 || .728 || 7.7 || 3.5 || 1.5 || .3 || 20.0
|- class="sortbottom"
| style="text-align:center;" colspan="2"|Career
| 123 || 89 || 24.0 || .476 || .353 || .687 || 5.5 || 2.1 || 1.0 || .2 || 12.0

References

External links

 Boise State Broncos bio

1996 births
Living people
21st-century African-American sportspeople
American men's basketball players
Basketball players from California
Boise State Broncos men's basketball players
Chicago Bulls draft picks
Chicago Bulls players
Phoenix Suns players
Santa Cruz Warriors players
Shooting guards
Sioux Falls Skyforce players
Small forwards
Sportspeople from Mission Viejo, California
Washington Wizards players
Windy City Bulls players
Mission Viejo High School alumni